Alexis Barrière, full name Daniel Alexandre François Barrière, also called Barrière aîné, (Paris 22 October 1792 – ca. 1865 ) was a 19th-century Frenchy playwright, engraver and song writer.

Biography 
An engraver, trained by his father, he drew a part of the campaign plans for the marshal Laurent de Gouvion-Saint-Cyr as well as maps of Swabia, Russia, Corsica or Spain and of the county Mayo.  He also made prints for the library.

His plays were presented on the most famous Parisian stages of the 19th century: Théâtre du Vaudeville, Théâtre des Variétés, Théâtre de l'Ambigu-Comique, etc.

His songs were published in 1829 in the book Étrennes lyriques ou Recueil de romances et nocturnes, with piano or harpes accompagnements by Antoine Romagnesi.

Plays and songs 
1813: Le Mari en vacances, comédie-vaudeville in 1 act, with Marc-Antoine Désaugiers
1816: Trois pour une ou les absents n'ont pas toujours tort, comédie-vaudeville en 1 act, with Désaugiers
1817: La Vendange normande, ou les Deux voisins, vaudeville in 1 act, with Michel-Joseph Gentil de Chavagnac
1830: Notre Grand'mère, chansonnette
1835: Mon bonnet de nuit, comédie-vaudeville in 1 act, with Georges Duval
1835: Oui et non, comédie-vaudeville in 2 acts
1837: Les savetiers francs-juges, chronique messinaise in 3 acts, mingled with songs
1840: Les Pages de Louis XII, comedy mingled with song, in 2 acts, with Ferdinand de Villeneuve
1842: Le poète, ou Les droits de l'auteur, comedy in 1 act and in verses
1848: L'Autel de la Patrie, hymne national, music by Félix Marie
1857: Le legs (The Legacy), comedy by Marivaux set in verses
1861: La Sainte-Catherine, ou Un bienfait n'est jamais perdu, à-propos-vaudeville in 1 act

References

Bibliography 
 Joseph-marie Quérard, La littérature française contemporaine, vol.3, 1827-1844, 
 Charles Gabet, Dictionnaire des artistes de l'école française au XIXe, 1831, 
 Edwin Colby Byam, Théodore Barrière, dramatist of the second empire, 1938, 

19th-century French dramatists and playwrights
French engravers
French songwriters
Male songwriters
Writers from Paris
1792 births
Year of death missing